The following lists show the administrative divisions of the lands belonging to the Hungarian crown (1000–1920) at selected points of time. The names are given in the main official language used in the Kingdom at the times in question.

For details on the functioning and development of the counties and some other administrative divisions see Counties of the Kingdom of Hungary.

Notes
This article does not show all states of administrative divisions that existed throughout the centuries, only the major ones. Especially for the medieval period, various sources often give slightly different divisions. Also, the lists of the individual points of time stem from different sources so that the first-level categorization is not necessarily compatible over time.

1038

Around 1074
Around 1074, the whole Kingdom of Hungary consisted of some 45–50 counties. The existence of many of them is disputed for this time period.

Counties

Frontier counties
The following castles are assumed to have been seats of frontier counties (marchiae, határispánságok), it is probable that other castles were such seats as well (ordered from the north to the south):

 in present-day Slovakia: Bratislava (at that time: Bresburc/ Preslawaspurch/Poson), Hlohovec (at that time: Golguc/Golgoc), Trenčín (at that time: Treinchen), Beckov (at that time: Blundus), Nitra (at that time: Nitria), Šintava (at that time: Sempte), Gemer Castle (at that time: Gomur), Zemplin Castle (at that time: Zemněn, Zemlyn)
 in present-day Ukraine: Uzhhorod (Ungvár), Borsova
 in present-day Hungary: Moson Castle, Sopron, Novum Castrum (Hungarian at that time: Újvár), Borsod Castle, Vasvár, Karakó (near Jánosháza), Zalavár (called Kolon at that time)
 present-day Romania: Dobaca (Hungarian: Doboka), Alba Iulia (Hungarian: Gyulafehérvár), Cluj-Napoca (Hungarian: Kolozsvár), Satu Mare (Hungarian: Szatmárnémeti), Timișoara (Hungarian: Temesvár), Turda (Hungarian: Torda)
 present-day Croatia: Vukovar (Hungarian: Valkóvár)
 present-day Serbia: Belgrade (Hungarian at that time: Fehérvár), Stara Palanka (Hungarian: Haram (Krassó)), Kovin (Hungarian: Kéve)

15th century
In the late 14th and in the 15th century there were around 70 counties, out of which 7(?) under the voivodship of Transylvania (in present-day Romania), 7 under the banate of Slavonia (mainly in present-day Slavonia and Croatia), and the rest forming Hungary proper (mainly present-day Hungary and Slovakia, with 10 counties entirely and 11 partially in present-day Slovakia.

Counties

Hungary proper

Transylvania

Special status

Hungary proper
Halasszék (a sedes)
Jászság
Kolbázszék (a sedes)
Kunság
Provincia XXIV oppidorum terrae Scepusiensis (in 1412, thirteen of the towns were pawned to Poland and kept a special status)

Transylvania
Aranyensis sedes (Hungarian:Aranyosszék)
Csikiensis sedes (Csíkszék)
Giergiensis sedes (Gyergyószék)
Kászonszék (a sedes; Casin in Romanian)
Kesdiensis sedes (Kézdiszék)
Marusiensis sedes (Marosszék)
Orbai sedes (Orbaiszék)
Sepsiensis sedes (Sepsiszék)
Udvarhelyensis sedes (Udvarhelyszék)

Free royal towns and the mining towns (Liberae regiae civitate et civitates montanae)
Their number was changing (the mining towns were largely situated in the Upper Lands – present-day Slovakia)

16th–18th centuries
In the 16th century, the Kingdom was so gravely impacted by Ottoman conquest that its territory was reduced to almost a third of its previous size. By 1541, the remaining part was renamed Royal Hungary and ruled by the Habsburgs.

Captaincies (1547 – 1699)

In 1547, Royal Hungary was divided for military and partly also administrative purposes in two captaincies-general (Hungarian: főkapitányságok,  Slovak: hlavné kapitanáty): 
Cisdanubia (largely present-day Slovakia)
Transdanubia (the remaining Royal Hungary).

Later on, these captaincies were further subdivided.

In 1553 and 1578, southern and southeastern regions were split off into the Military Frontier and were de facto no longer part of the Kingdom.

Also, after 1606 there were the following captaincies-general:
Captaincy of Upper Hungary (eastern Slovakia and adjacent northeastern present-day Hungary, part of present-day northern Romania and part of Carpathian Ruthenia, created 1563)
Captaincy of Lower Hungary (western and central Slovakia, created 1563)
Captaincy of Győr (territories between Lake Balaton and river Danube)
Captaincy of Kanizsa (western Hungary)
Captaincy of Croatia (western Croatia)
Captaincy of Slavonia (northern Croatia)

Counties (1699 - 1848)
Note that many of the counties ceased to exist during the Turkish occupation (app. 1541 – 1699/1718). For administrative divisions on the Turkish territory see Ottoman Empire.

After the defeat of the Turks there were some 70 counties in the whole Kingdom of Hungary again. After the final defeat of the Turks in 1718, the three southern counties Temesiensis, Torontaliensis and Krassovinsis created the special administrative district Banatus Temesiensis (Hungarian: Temesi Bánság). This district was dissolved again in 1779, but its southernmost part remained part of the Military Frontier (Confiniaria militaria)  till the late 19th century.

The following list does not show Transylvania. The "districtus" is only a traditional formal division. Note that some of the previous counties, e. g. the Zarandiensis, were part of Transylvania at this time.

(a) Districtus Cis-Danubianus (13):
Arvensis
Bacsensis
Barsiensis
Honthiensis
Lyptoviensis
Nitriensis
Neogradiensis
Pesthiensis
Posoniensis
Strigoniensis
Trenchiniensis
Turocziensis
Zoliensis

(b) Districtus Trans-Danubianus (11):
Albensis
Baranyiensis
Castriferrei
Comaromiensis
Jauriensis
Mosoniensis, 
Simigiensis
Soproniensis
Tolnensis
Vesprimiensis
Szaladiensis

(c) Districtus Cis-Tybiscanus (10): 
Abaujvariensis
Bereghiensis
Borsodiensis
Gömöriensis
Hevesiensis et Szolnok mediocris
Sarosiensis
Scepusiensis
Tornensis
Unghvariensis
Zempliniensis

(d) Districtus Trans-Tibiscanus (12): 
Aradiensis
Bekesiensis
Bihariensis 
Csanadiensis
Csongradiensis
Krassovinsis
Maramarosiensis
Szabolcsensis
Szathmariensis
Temesiensis
Torontaliensis
Ugotgensis

(e) Counties between the Drava and Sava (after the defeat of the Turks around 1700, they were considered part of Croatia-Slavonia):
Poseganus
Sirmiensis
Verovitiensis/Vukovariensis

Free districts (Circuli/Districtus liberi)
These were privileged territories, which were totally exempt from the county system.
 Districtus Jazygum et Cumanum
 Oppida sedecim Scepusiensia - since 1772, before 1772 the towns were pawned to Poland and had another special status
 Oppida privilegiata Hajdonicalia – since the 17th century

Free royal towns and the mining towns (Liberae regiae civitate et civitates montanae)
Their number was changing

After the 1848/1849 Revolution
For details see Comitatus (Kingdom of Hungary)

1849–1860

During this period, the Kingdom of Croatia (with Međimurje), Kingdom of Slavonia, and the Voivodeship of Serbia and Banatus Temesiensis were separated from the Kingdom of Hungary and directly subordinated to Vienna (Austria). The remaining territory of the Kingdom of Hungary (which did not include Transylvania at that time) was divided into 5 Districts. These Districts were divided into counties, whose traditional territories were modified in 1850 and 1853; several of the traditional counties were merged or partitioned. The official language during this period was German. The districts and counties were:

Pest-Ofen
Pest-Pilis. The northern part of the former Pest-Pilis-Solt County, including all of the former county of Pilis.
Pest-Solt. The southern part of Pest-Pilis-Solt, including all of the former region of Solt.
Stuhlweißenburg (Székesfehérvár; former Fejér County under the name of its capital Stuhlweißenburg)
Gran (Esztergom). Closely resembled Komárom-Esztergom County as it was between 1923 and 1938.
Heves. Roughly the northern half of the former Heves-Külső-Szolnok County, bounded mostly by the Tisza.
Szolnok. Roughly the southern half of the former Heves-Külső-Szolnok County, bounded mostly by the Tisza.
Borsod
Csongrad
Jászság, Kiskunság and Nagykunság)
Preßburg
Preßburg (Pozsony)
Ober-Neutra (Upper/Over Nyitra). Included those parts of Neutra/Nyitra west of the Waag. The capital, Tyrnau, was formerly part of Preßburg/Pozsony County.
Unter-Neutra (Lower/Under Nyitra). Included those parts of Neutra/Nyitra east of the Waag.
Trentschin (Trencsén)
Arva-Turócz, merger re-affirmed in 1853
Liptau (Liptó)
Hont
Zohl (Zólyom)
Bars
Neograd (Nógrád)
Komorn (Komárom).
Ödenburg
Wieselburg (Moson)
Ödenburg (Sopron)
Raab (Győr)
Eisenburg (Vas)
Weszprim (Veszprém)
Szalad (Zala). Excluded the Međimurje, which was attached to Croatia.
Sümegh (Somogy)
Tolna
Baranyá
Kaschau
Gömör (Gömör-Kishont county under the name Gömör) 
Zips (Szepes)
Saros
Abaúj-Torna
Zemplin (Zemplén)
Beregh-Ugocsa
Maramaros
Großwardein
Arad. Western part around Elek attached to Békes-Csanad in 1853.
Csanad (1849–53)
Bekes (1849–53)
Békes-Csanad (1853–60). Included the former territories of Békes and Csanad as well as the area around Elek which had previously belonged to Arad county (including a salient (panhandle) of formerly Arad territory which lay between Békes and Csanad).
Ober-Bihar (Upper/Over Bihar, 1850–53)
Unter-Bihar (Lower/Under Bihar, 1850–53)
Süd-Bihar (South Bihar, 1853–60). Former southern territory of Bihar (mostly delineated by the Berettyó/Barcău river and associated canals).
Nord-Bihar (North Bihar, 1853–60). Former northern territory of Bihar (mostly delineated by the Berettyó/Barcău river and associated canals), as well as the former Hajdúság and former western parts of Szabolcs County.
Szatmar
Szabolcz
 Szabolcz  (Szabolcz with the Hajdú cities; 1849–53). The Hajdúság and western parts of Szabolcz were attached to Nord-Bihar 1853.

Notes

1860–1867
In October 1860, the Districts were abolished and the pre-1848 counties were restored.

1867–1920

From 1867 the administrative and political divisions of the lands belonging to the Hungarian crown (Kingdom of Hungary) were significantly remodelled. In 1868 Transylvania was definitely reunited with Hungary proper, and the town and district of Fiume (Rijeka) declared autonomous. In 1873 part of the Military Frontier was united with Hungary proper and part with Croatia-Slavonia. Hungary proper, according to ancient usage, was generally divided into four great divisions or circles, and Transylvania up to 1876 was regarded as the fifth.

In 1876 a general system of counties was introduced. According to this division Hungary proper was divided into seven statistical regions having no administrative functions, of which Transylvania formed one.

The following administrative divisions existed between 1886 and 1920:

Rural counties
In the following, the key in the brackets gives the capital towns around 1910 first (note however that the capitals were usually changing throughout the centuries) and then the abbreviation for the country in which the territory is situated today:

The Kingdom of Hungary was divided into the following 71 counties:

Hungary proper
(a) On the left bank of the Danube:

Árva County (Alsókubin, SK, PL)
Bars County (Aranyosmarót, SK)
Esztergom County (Esztergom, SK, HU)
Hont County (Ipolyság, SK, HU)
Liptó County (Liptószentmiklós, SK)
Nógrád County (Balassagyarmat, SK, HU)
Nyitra County (Nyitra, SK)
Pozsony County (Pozsony, SK, HU)
Trencsén County (Trencsén, SK)
Turóc County (Turócszentmárton, SK)
Zólyom County (Besztercebánya, SK)

(b) On the right bank of the Danube:

Baranya County (Pécs, HU, HR)
Fejér County (Székesfehérvár, HU)
Győr County (Győr, HU, SK)
Komárom County (Komárom, SK, HU)
Moson County (Mosonmagyaróvár, HU, AT, SK)
Somogy County (Kaposvár, HU)
Sopron County (Sopron, HU, AT)
Tolna County (Szekszárd, HU)
Vas County (Szombathely, HU, AT, SI)
Veszprém County (Veszprém, HU)
Zala County (Zalaegerszeg, HU, HR, SI)

(c) Between the Danube and Tisza:

Bács-Bodrog County (Zombor, HU, SR)
Csongrád County (Szentes, HU, SR)
Heves County (Eger, HU)
Jász-Nagykun-Szolnok County (Szolnok, HU) 
Pest-Pilis-Solt-Kiskun County (Budapest, HU)

(d) On the right bank of the Tisza:

Abaúj-Torna County (Kassa, SK, HU) Note: formed in 1881 from the counties of Abaúj County and Torna County.
Bereg County (Beregszász, UA, HU)
Borsod County (Miskolc, HU)
Gömör és Kis-Hont County (Rimaszombat, SK, HU)
Sáros County (Eperjes, SK)
Szepes County (Lőcse, SK, PL)
Ung County (Ungvár, UA, SK, HU)
Zemplén County (Sátoraljaújhely, SK, HU)

(e) On the left bank of the Tisza:

Békés County (Gyula, HU)
Bihar County (Nagyvárad, RO, HU)
Hajdú County (Debrecen, HU)
Máramaros County (Máramarossziget, UA, RO)
Szabolcs County (Nyíregyháza, HU, UA)
Szatmár County (Nagykároly, RO, HU) 
Szilágy County (Zilah, RO) 
Ugocsa County (Nagyszőllős, UA, RO)

(f) Between the Tisza and the Maros:

Arad County (Arad, RO, HU)
Csanád County (Makó, HU, RO)
Krassó-Szörény County (Lugos, RO) Note: formed in 1880 from the counties of Krassó County and Szörény County.
Temes County (Temesvár, RO, SR)
Torontál County (Nagybecskerek, SR, RO, HU)

(g) Királyhágón túl (i.e. "over the royal pass through the mountains", roughly equal to Transylvania, all in present-day Romania):

Alsó-Fehér County (Nagyenyed)
Beszterce-Naszód County (Beszterce)
Brassó County (Brassó)
Csík County (Csíkszereda)
Fogaras County (Fogaras)
Háromszék County (Sepsiszentgyörgy)
Hunyad County (Déva)
Kis-Küküllő County (Dicsőszentmárton)
Kolozs County (Kolozsvár)
Maros-Torda County (Marosvásárhely)
Nagy-Küküllő County (Segesvár)
Szeben County (Nagyszeben)
Szolnok-Doboka County (Dés)
Torda-Aranyos County (Torda)
Udvarhely County (Székelyudvarhely)

Kingdom of Croatia and Slavonia
Kingdom of Croatia and Slavonia was divided into eight counties (all, except for most of Syrmia, in present-day Croatia):

Bjelovar-Križevci (Bjelovar, HR)
Lika-Krbava (Gospić, HR)
Modruš-Rijeka (Ogulin, HR)
Požega (Požega, HR)
Syrmia (Vukovar, HR, SR)
Varaždin (Varaždin, HR)
Virovitica (Osijek, HR)
Zagreb (Zagreb, HR)

Towns with municipal rights
The following 30 Hungarian towns had municipal rights:

Hungary proper
Hungary proper had twenty-six urban counties or towns with municipal rights.
These were:
 Arad
 Baja
 Debrecen
 Győr
 Hódmezővásárhely
 Kassa (Košice)
 Kecskemét
 Kolozsvár (Cluj)
 Komárom (Komárno)
 Marosvásárhely (Târgu Mureş)
 Miskolc (from 1909)
 Nagyvárad (Oradea)
 Pancsova (Pančevo)
 Pécs
 Pozsony (Bratislava)
 Selmecbánya and Bélabánya (Banská Štiavnica and Banská Belá) – one urban county
 Sopron
 Szabadka (Subotica)
 Szatmárnémeti (Satu Mare)
 Szeged
 Székesfehérvár
 Temesvár (Timișoara)
 Újvidék (Novi Sad)
 Versec (Vršac)
 Zombor (Sombor)
 Budapest – the capital of the country.

Croatia-Slavonia
In Croatia-Slavonia there were four urban counties or towns with municipal rights namely:
 Eszék (Osijek)
 Varasd (Varaždin)
 Zágráb (Zagreb)
 Zimony (Zemun)

Fiume (Rijeka)
The town and district of Fiume (Rijeka) formed a separate division. It was a subject of dispute between Hungary proper and Croatia-Slavonia and changed hands several times (its desirability as a seaport caused it to change hands even after the Hungarian-Croatian union eventually broke up).

References

See also
 Regions of Hungary
 Counties of Hungary
 Demographic history of Syrmia
 Districts of Hungary (from 2013)
 Subregions of Hungary (until 2013)
 Administrative divisions of the Kingdom of Hungary (until 1920)
 Counties of the Kingdom of Hungary
 Administrative divisions of the Kingdom of Hungary (1941–1945)
 List of cities and towns of Hungary
 NUTS:HU

External links
 1910 Maps of the counties
 Maps of Counties of the Hungarian Kingdom (1913) from Talmamedia.com

and
Kingdom of Hungary
Hungary
Kingdom of Hungary